Körtánc is  a style of Hungarian folk dance which originated in Nyitra County, now in Slovakia. It is a circle dance in  time.

References

Hungarian styles of music
Hungarian dances
Circle dances